Donna Lynn Dixon is an American actress.

Biography
 
Dixon was born in Alexandria, Virginia, to Earl Dixon.  Her father owned a nightclub in Lorton, Virginia, on U.S. 1 called Hillbilly Heaven.

Career
Dixon began her career as a model and was named Miss Virginia USA in 1976 and Miss District of Columbia World in 1977. She competed in both Miss USA 1976 and Miss World USA 1977.

On television, Dixon portrayed Allison Hayes in the NBC drama Berringer's. She co-starred with Tom Hanks in the early 1980s situation comedy Bosom Buddies, playing the role of Sonny Lumet.

Personal Life
Months after they worked together in the film Doctor Detroit (1983), Dixon and actor Dan Aykroyd married. They later starred together in the films Twilight Zone: The Movie (1983) (though they did not share any scenes), Spies Like Us (1985) and The Couch Trip (1988). Dixon and Aykroyd have three daughters, among whom is singer-songwriter Vera Sola (whose real name is Danielle Aykroyd) and actor/model Belle Aykroyd.

Filmography

References

External links

 
 

Living people
Female models from Virginia
American film actresses
American television actresses
Miss USA 1970s delegates
Actresses from Alexandria, Virginia
20th-century American actresses
21st-century American women
Year of birth missing (living people)